Katoa is a sub-prefecture of Mayo-Kebbi Est Region Chad.

References 

Populated places in Chad